Low Latency High-Definition Audio Codec (LHDC) is an audio codec technology developed by Savitech. LHDC allows high-resolution audio streaming over Bluetooth. It is a high-quality Bluetooth codec based on the A2DP Bluetooth protocol and allows a bit-rate of up to 900 kbit/s compared to SBC's bit rate of 345 kbit/s .

LHDC is an alternative to Bluetooth SIG's SBC and LC3 codecs. Its main competitors are Qualcomm's aptX-HD/aptX Adaptive and Sony's LDAC codec.

Starting from Android 10, enumeration constant symbols for LHDC and LLAC are part of the Android Open Source Project, enabling every OEM to integrate this standard into their own Android devices freely. Older versions of Android require LHDC/LLAC enumeration constant symbols to be implemented by the smartphone manufacturers or Android app. Android apps with this type of LHDC support include Savitech's Hi-Res BT Player, FiiO Music, HIFIMAN Music and DA&T Audio.

LHDC 
LHDC supports bitrates of 400/560/900 kbit/s, bit-depth of up to 24 bit and sample rate of up to 96 kHz.

The first Smartphone to support LHDC was the Huawei Mate 10.

On 17 September 2019, the Japan Audio Society (JAS) certified LHDC with their Hi-Res Audio Wireless certification. Currently the only codecs with the Hi-Res Audio Wireless certification are LHDC and LDAC.

LLAC 
Low Latency Audio Codec (LLAC) is also called LHDC LL. It is based on the high definition wireless audio technology from LHDC, but designed for low latency and features an auto-detect gaming mode. Savitech claims LLAC has end-to-end latency of around ~30ms. LLAC supports bitrates of 400/600 kbit/s, bit-depth of up to 24 bit and sample rate of up to 48 kHz. LLAC has no hardware requirement for the transmitter.

The first Smartphone to support LLAC was the Huawei P30.

Hi-Res Wireless Audio (HWA) Union 
On 2 September 2018 the Hi-Res Wireless Audio (HWA) Union was formed to promote LHDC adoption. Also known as the HWA Alliance. The HWA Union Board of Directors includes:

 AKM
 China Electronics Technology Group Corporation
 Cirrus Logic
 Edifier
 Guoguang Electric
 HiFiMAN
 HiVi
 Huawei
 Institute of Acoustics of the Chinese Academy of Sciences
 Savitech
 iriver
 Sennheiser
 Taihe Music Group

Other HWA Union members include:

 ams AG
 Astell & Kern
 Audio-Technica
 Aukey
 Cayin
 Cozoy
 Coolhere
 Colorfly
 DA&T
 DA-ART
 DUNU
 FiiO
 Fostex
 Haylou
 HiBy
 infly
 iEAST
 Liesheng
 Musiland
 NFJ FX-AUDIO
 OC Studio
 Onkyo
 Pioneer
 ProStereo
 QCY
 Questyle Audio
 Quloos (QLS HiFi)
 Radius
 Shanling
 S.M.S.L
 TASCAM
 TEAC
 TempTec
 Tecsun
 TiinLab
 Topping
 Tube Fan Audio
 VMN
 xDuoo
 YULONG Audio
 1MORE

HWA Certification 
On March 27, 2018, Huawei and Savitech announced the Hi-Res Wireless Audio (HWA) Certification. Platinum HWA Certification requires frequency response over 40 kHz, THD+N<-90 dB, SNR>110 dB, and playback using the at least 24bit/96 kHz. Gold HWA Certification requires frequency response over 20 kHz, THD+N<-80 dB, SNR>100 dB, and playback using the at least 24bit/48 kHz.

See also 
 List of codecs
 Lossy data compression

References

External links 
 

Audio codecs